KRI Tombak (629) is a  of the Indonesian Navy. Built by PT PAL, she is the second ship in her class.

Characteristics
At full charge, it has a draft of 2.6 m, and the ship's displacement is 460 tonnes.

Service history
Tombak was built by PT PAL and was commissioned into the Indonesian Navy on 27 August 2014. She was initially assigned to the Eastern Fleet Command (Koarmatim). Her missile launchers were removed in late 2017 and a Type 630 CIWS was installed, but by May 2019 there were plans to reattach the launchers in a different position.

In August 2019, she participated in the rescue of passengers of the MV Santika Nusantara, a RORO passenger ship which caught fire in the Java Sea.

References

2014 ships
Sampari-class fast attack craft